Andrew Johnson (born September 12, 1889) was a member of the Michigan House of Representatives who served from 1942 to 1943.

Johnson was born in Kent County, Michigan. Johnson was a Congregationalist. Johnson married Garnet Dailey in 1915. Together, they had five children. Johnson was a newspaper publisher. In 1948, Johnson was the alternate delegate to Republican National Convention from Michigan. In 1950, Johnson was the Benzie County Republican Party chair.

References 

1889 births
People from Kent County, Michigan
American Congregationalists
Republican Party members of the Michigan House of Representatives
20th-century American politicians
Year of death missing